Richard Meade, 2nd Earl of Clanwilliam (10 May 1766 – 3 September 1805) was an Irish peer, styled Lord Gilford from 1776 to 1800.

Life
He was the eldest son of John Meade, 1st Earl of Clanwilliam and his wife, the heiress Theodosia Magill. In October 1793, while Gilford was abroad on the Continent, his mother announced him as a candidate for a by-election in Down, apparently seeking an electoral pact with the Marquess of Downshire, who had just vacated the seat. Ultimately, his candidacy was withdrawn and Downshire's candidate was elected unopposed.

Meanwhile, Gilford was laying the foundations for a family rupture. He fell in love with and married Caroline, Countess of Thun (19 May 1769 – 1800), daughter of Maria Wilhelmine von Thun und Hohenstein, on 16 October 1793. Marriage to a penniless Roman Catholic noblewoman was unacceptable in his Ascendancy family, and the marriage estranged him from his parents, who, at the time, were liquidating his father's estates to pay the enormous debts they had accumulated. His consent was necessary to break the entail, but as he had his own debts and a newborn daughter to provide for, he was obliged to agree to the sale of his patrimony. The couple returned from Ireland to Vienna in 1795 or 1796, where they ultimately had three children:
 Caroline Meade, Countess Széchenyi (1794–1820), married Pál Széchenyi, elder son of Ferenc Széchényi
 Richard Meade, 3rd Earl of Clanwilliam (1795–1879)
 Selina Meade, Countess Clam-Martinic (1797–1872) married Karl Johann Nepomuk, Count of Clam-Martinic (1792–1840)

In October 1800, Gilford's father died and he became Earl of Clanwilliam, and he briefly returned to Ireland. His wife died shortly thereafter. He realized little in the way of an inheritance: he was left the Gill Hall estate in Gilford, County Down, part of his mother's inheritance, but part of her jointure was still charged on its revenues, and her more valuable estate in Rathfriland went to his younger brother Hon. Robert Meade instead. He spent the rest of his life in Vienna, where he was an avid gardener; while manuring a flowerbed, he contracted an infection that killed him on 3 September 1805. After his death, his two daughters were raised by their aunt Maria Christiane and her husband Karl Alois, Prince Lichnowsky, while his son was raised in England.

References

1766 births
1805 deaths
Earls of Clanwilliam